Nabanita Handique is an Indian politician. She was elected to the Assam Legislative Assembly from Sonari in the 2019 by election as a member of the Bharatiya Janata Party. By-elections happen due to Topon Kumar Gogoi elected to Parliament.

References

Living people
Bharatiya Janata Party politicians from Assam
People from Charaideo district
Assam MLAs 2016–2021
Year of birth missing (living people)